Runcinoidea is a taxonomic superfamily (according to the taxonomy of the Gastropoda by Bouchet & Rocroi, 2005) or a clade Runcinaecea (according to the Malaquias et al. (2009)) of sea slugs, marine gastropod mollusks in the order Runcinida

Taxonomy

2005 taxonomy
Runcinoidea was recognized as a superfamily in the clade  Cephalaspidea, within the informal group Opisthobranchia in the taxonomy of the Gastropoda by Bouchet & Rocroi, 2005).

They also recognized two families, Runcinidae and Ilbiidae.

2009 taxonomy 
Malaquias et al. (2009) reinstated Runcinacea as a valid taxon outside the Cephalaspidea.

They also recognized two families Runcinidae (with genus Runcina) and Ilbiidae, but they did not mention superfamilies.

2010 taxonomy 
Jörger et al. 2010 moved Runcinacea to the Euopisthobranchia.

2017 taxonomy
Runcinoidea was classified in the order Runcinida by the revised classification of the Gastropoda.

Families 
Families within the Runcinoidea include:
 Family Runcinidae H. Adams & A. Adams, 1854
 Family Ilbiidae Burn, 1963
Synonyms
 Ildicidae Burn, 1963: synonym of Runcinidae H. Adams & A. Adams, 1854
 Peltidae Vayssière, 1885: synonym of Runcinidae H. Adams & A. Adams, 1854

References

External links

Euopisthobranchia